Lashan Egalahewa was a Sri Lankan cricketer. He was a left-arm medium-fast bowler who played for Colts Cricket Club.

Egalahewa made a single first-class appearance for the side, during the 1988–89 season, against Sri Lanka Air Force. From the tailend, he scored 2 runs in the only innings in which he batted.

Egalahewa bowled ten overs in the match, conceding 31 runs.

External links
Lashan Egalahewa at CricketArchive 

Sri Lankan cricketers
Colts Cricket Club cricketers
Living people
Year of birth missing (living people)
Place of birth missing (living people)